Jean Henrion was a French figure skater. He was the 1932-39 French champion in men's singles and a two-time national pairs champion with Suzy Boulesteix.

Results

References
 skatabase

Navigation

French male single skaters
French male pair skaters
Year of birth missing
Year of death missing